Cotati may refer to:

Cotati, California, a city in the San Francisco Bay Area
, built for the United States Shipping Board in 1919 and sunk in 1942 as Empire Avocet
Cotati (comics), a fictional alien race in the Marvel Universe

See also
 Coati, a New World mammal